Ángel Alonso may refer to:
 Ángel Alonso (volleyball) (born 1967), Spanish volleyball player
 Angel David Alonso (born 1985), Paraguayan footballer
 Pichi Alonso (Àngel Alonso Herrera, born 1954), Spanish footballer